Central Standard: On Education  is a documentary web series that focuses on Chicago's education system.  Following five 8th grade students attending public schools across the Chicago metropolitan area, Central Standard: On Education chronicles the challenges these students face while transitioning to High School.

Central Standard: On Education was produced by Scrappers Film Group and WTTW.

References

Education in Chicago
Television series by WTTW
Chicago Public Schools